Hæstad is a Norwegian surname. Notable people with the surname include:

Kristofer Hæstad (born 1983), Norwegian footballer
Morten Hæstad (born 1987), Norwegian footballer

Norwegian-language surnames
Surnames of Norwegian origin